The Savina Monastery (lit. "Sava's monastery") is a Serbian Orthodox monastery of three churches near the city Herceg Novi in the Bay of Kotor, located in thick Mediterranean vegetation in one of the most beautiful parts of the Montenegrin Littoral.

Churches
The small Church of the Assumption is 10m high and 6m wide. Its foundation dates to 1030, although the oldest record of it is from 1648. Its reconstruction began in the late 17th century, with the arrival of refugee monks from Tvrdoš Monastery in Herzegovina, and it was completed in 1831.
The Great Temple of the Assumption was built between the 1777 and 1799, and builder was a master Nikola Foretić from the island of Korčula.
The Church (or Temple) of St. Sava, built by Saint Sava, located outside the monastery complex.

Relics
The monastery has a large number of relics originating from the time of the Nemanjić dynasty (relics of Empress Jelena, cross of Saint Sava), including those transferred from Tvrdoš Monastery.

The iconostasis of the church was done by Simeon Lazović and it represents a unique work of Serb Baroque art.

Emir Kusturica's baptism
On Đurđevdan (St. George's Day) in 2005, director Emir Kusturica was baptised in the monastery as Nemanja Kusturica.

References

Further reading

External links 
 Savina monastery
 Nikanor, nastojatelj Savina monastery ( "Orthodoxy", no. 930, 15 December 2005.)

Serbian Orthodox monasteries in Montenegro
Herceg Novi
15th-century Serbian Orthodox church buildings
Medieval Serbian Orthodox monasteries
Medieval Montenegro